Al-Hurriya, alternatively Al-Horaya is a neighborhood of Baghdad, Iraq. 

Hurriya